Camp Douglas can refer to a location in the United States:

 Camp Douglas, Wisconsin, a village
 Camp Douglas (Chicago), a Union POW camp during the American Civil War
 Camp Douglas (Wyoming), a US POW camp during World War II
 Camp Douglas (Fort Douglas, Utah), a U.S. Army post along the Oregon Trail in Utah

Camp Douglas can refer to a farmstead in Spitsbergen:
 Camp Douglas, Spitsbergen, a former mining encampment

Campdouglas can refer to a location in Balmaghie, Scotland